Amelia Horne also known as Amy Haines and Amelia Bennett (1839-1921) was a British memoir writer. She is known for her memoirs describing her experiences as a survivor of the Siege of Cawnpore during the Indian Rebellion of 1857, having been abduced and kept prisoner by a sowar during the Satichaura Ghat massacre, thereby avoiding the Bibighar massacre.

Life
She was born in Calcutta as the daughter of the British master mariner Frederick Horne and Emma Horne, and became the step daughter of John Hampden Cook. 

She experienced the Siege of Cawnpore with her mother and stepfather. During the Satichaura Ghat massacre, she was abducted by a sowar, who took her as his captive wife. She thus avoided the Bibighar massacre. 

She was eventually released by the sowar, and allowed to return to her family in Calcutta. She married the railway official William Bennett (d. 1877).

In 1872, she testified in court in Lucknow in favor of Maulvi Liaquat Ali, testifying that he had saved her during the Satichaura Ghat massacre. They were at least two other women with similar fates during the rebellion, as both Ulrica Wheeler and Eliza Fanthome were similarly abducted during the rebellion.

Legacy
She was the author of two memoirs describing her experiences during the Rebellion: the first published in 1858 under the name Mrs Amy Haines, and the second under the name Amelia Bennett, published in The Nineteenth Century and After 1913.

References 

1839 births
1921 deaths
People from British India
19th-century Indian women
British people of the Indian Rebellion of 1857
19th-century memoirists